is a railway station in the city of Owariasahi, Aichi Prefecture,  Japan, operated by Meitetsu.

Lines

Station layout
The station has two opposed side platforms connected by a footbridge. The station has automated ticket machines, Manaca automated turnstiles and is unattended.

Platforms

Adjacent stations

|-
!colspan=5|Nagoya Railroad

Station history
Inba Station was opened on April 2, 1905, as a station on the privately operated Seto Electric Railway.  The Seto Electric Railway was absorbed into the Meitetsu group on September 1, 1939. The station was closed from 1944 to 1946 due to World War II, and was closed again on April 5, 1969. However, with the increase in residential developments in the surrounding areas, the station was reopened on December 22, 1995. It has been unattended since 2006.

Passenger statistics
In fiscal 2017, the station was used by an average of 5,439 passengers daily.

Surrounding area
Hakuho Elementary School

See also
 List of Railway Stations in Japan

References

External links

 Official web page 

Railway stations in Japan opened in 1905
Railway stations in Aichi Prefecture
Stations of Nagoya Railroad
Owariasahi, Aichi